Valpovo is a town in Slavonia, Croatia. The population of Valpovo is 7,406, with a total of 11,563 in the municipality.

Name
In Hungarian the town is known as Valpó and in German as Walpach. In antiquity, it was called Iovalum.  There are several suggested etymologies. One is that it comes from the Latin root *Iov-, meaning "divine". However, the ending can't be explained by Latin. One explanation is that it comes from the Indo-European words *yow and *h2elut, so that it means "magical beer." The other, more likely, is that it comes from the Indo-European roots *yow and *h2elom, so that it means "magical herb", whatever plant that signified. Perhaps the simplest explanation is that it comes from the Indo-European word *wel, meaning "valley", whatever "Io-" meant.

Demographics
The settlements in the municipal area of Valpovo are:
 Harkanovci, population 506
 Ivanovci, population 460
 Ladimirevci, population 1,587
 Marjančaci, population 308
 Nard, population 516
 Šag, population 429
 Valpovo, population 7,406
 Zelčin, population 351

In the census of 2011, the absolute majority  were Croats.

History

The town is first mentioned in 1332. It was captured by Ottoman Empire in 1543. It was initially kaza centre in Sanjak of Pojega till 1601. It was later in sanjak centre in Kanije Eyalet till Austrian conquest in 1687.

In the late 19th and early 20th century, Valpovo was part of the Virovitica County of the Kingdom of Croatia-Slavonia.  In March 1945, German forces launched Operation Spring Awakening.  On the southern arm which moved north through Valpovo was the 1st Cossack Cavalry Division.  The operation was as disastrous as it was ambitious.  Yugoslav partisans of the 3rd Army (Yugoslav Partisans) continuously harassed and delayed the Cossacks.  Shortly after the end of World War II, officials in the communist Yugoslav regime established a labor camp for Germans which operated until May 1946.

Economy
Economy is based on farming, livestock breeding, forestry, wood and timber and foodstuffs industries; close to the town are oil and natural gas deposits. Valpovo lies on a regional road that connects it to Osijek and Donji Miholjac, as well a road to Belišće and to Bizovac through Ladimirevci.

Attractions

Located close to the banks of the Drava river (5 km), Valpovo was an ancient dwelling of feudal families. Major tourist attraction include important cultural and historical heritage, (remains of a mediaeval fortification, the old brickwork bridge, churches) and a landscaped park, protected as a horticultural monument. Prandau-Normann Castle: Count Normann-Ehrenfels and Baron Prandau-Hilleprandt had a magnificent castle that was rebuilt seven times. They planted 121 herbal sorts on 250,000 square meters. Valpovo's park is one of the most beautiful in Slavonia.

The most important annual event is the Valpovo Summer, attended by a number of cultural clubs with folklore, music, theatrical and other performances. Angling opportunities are provided on the nearby rivers Karašica, Vučica, Drava, as well as on lakes and fishponds; hunting grounds are offered nearby. Slavonian specialities, venison and freshwater fish, and quality wines add to the visitor opportunities of the Valpovo region.

References

External links

 

Municipalities of Osijek-Baranja County
Cities and towns in Croatia
Slavonia
14th-century establishments in Croatia
1332 establishments in Europe